"Perfect" is the ninth single by PJ & Duncan and the third to be taken from their second album Top Katz.

Track listing

Chart performance

Weekly charts

References

1995 singles
Ant & Dec songs
1995 songs
Telstar Records singles
Songs written by Declan Donnelly
Songs written by Anthony McPartlin